Yelizaveta Mikhailovna Sadovskaya (April 23 (May 5), 1872 - June 4, 1934) was Russian and Soviet actress, Honored Artist of the RSFSR (1927).

Biography
Elizaveta Mikhailovna Sadovskaya was born in Moscow on April 23 (May 5), 1872 in the family of Olga Osipovna and Mikhail Provich Sadovsky. Brother - actor and director Prov Sadovsky Jr., grandfather - Prov Mikhailovich Sadovsky

In 1894 she graduated from drama courses at the Moscow Theatre School (teachers O. A. Pravdin and M. P. Sadovsky) and was accepted into the troupe of the Maly Theatre, where she worked until the end of her life.

During the life of her mother, Yelizaveta Mikhailovna had the stage name Sadovskaya 2nd.

Possessing great stage charm, Yelizaveta Mikhailovna created vivid, memorable images of Russian girls.

Yelizaveta Mikhailovna died on June 4, 1934, in Moscow. She was buried at the Pyatnitsky cemetery.

Recognition and awards
Honored Artist of the RSFSR (1927)

Roles in the theatre
1894 - "Vasilisa Melentievna" A. N. Ostrovsky – Anna
"Forest" by A. N. Ostrovsky – Aksyusha
“Poverty is not a vice” by A. N. Ostrovsky – Gordevna
"Wolves and Sheep" by A. N. Ostrovsky – Glafira
"The Snow Maiden" by A. N. Ostrovsky - Snow Maiden
“Truth is good, but happiness is better” A. N. Ostrovsky – Poliksen
"Talents and Admirers" by A. N. Ostrovsky – Negin
"Tenement house" A. N. Ostrovsky – Yulinka
"Jokers" by A. N. Ostrovsky – Verochka
"Thunderstorm" A. N. Ostrovsky – Varvara
"Inspector" N. V. Gogol - Marya Antonovna
Shakespeare's "The Tempest" – Ariel
"Woe from Wit" Griboedova – Liza
The Marriage of Figaro by Beaumarchais – Suzanne
"Fighters" B. S. Romashova – Lenchitskaya

References

1872 births
1934 deaths
Russian actresses
Soviet actresses